The Northern People's Party (NPP) was a political party in the Gold Coast which aimed to protect the interests of those in the Northern region of Ghana. 

The NPP's leader was Simon Diedong Dombo, the traditional chief of Duori in the Upper Region. Formed in 1954, the party contested the 1954 election and the 1956 election. In November 1957 it merged with other opposition parties against the Convention People's Party to form the United Party.

Founding members of the party also included  Mumuni Bawumia, J.A. Braimah, Tolon Naa Yakubu Tali, Adam Amandi, Naa Abeifaa Karbo, Imoru Salifu and C.K. Tedam.

References

Defunct political parties in Ghana
Political parties disestablished in 1957
Political parties established in 1954